Chester Linwood Nourse (August 7, 1887 – April 20, 1958) was a relief pitcher in Major League Baseball who played briefly for the Boston Red Sox during the  season. A native of Ipswich, Massachusetts, he attended Brown University.

In a three-game career, Nourse posted a 7.20 earned run average in 5.0 innings of work, including two games finished, three strikeouts, five walks and five hits allowed without a decision or saves.

Nourse died at the age of 70 in Clearwater, Florida.

External links

Retrosheet

1887 births
1958 deaths
Boston Red Sox players
Major League Baseball pitchers
Sacramento Sacts players
Brown University alumni
Baseball players from Massachusetts
People from Ipswich, Massachusetts
Sportspeople from Essex County, Massachusetts